The Society for Disability Studies is an international academic network of disability studies practitioners. It often abbreviates its name to SDS, though that abbreviation continues to be used by academics and political scientists to describe the Students for a Democratic Society organization in the United States. The society's overall goal is to promote disability studies as a serious academic discipline on par with philosophy, the social sciences, and similar fields.

Definition of disability studies
In 1993 the society adopted an official definition of "Disability Studies":

Founding and history 
The organization was founded in 1982 first as the Section for the Study of Chronic Illness, Impairment, and Disability (SSCIID), and renamed Society for Disability Studies in 1986. Its founders are Daryl Evans, Nora Groce, Steve Hey, Gary Kiger, John Seidel, Jessica Scheer and Irving Kenneth Zola (1935–1994). The Society for Disability Studies is a 501(c)(3) not-for-profit organization.

The Society maintains affiliation status with the Western Social Science Association (WSSA) through its Chronic Disease and Disability section. Currently, the SDS has hundreds of members both nationally and internationally who continue to make disability studies a part of academic conversations.

Activities and publications
The Society for Disability Studies holds an annual conference in June and publishes a quarterly peer-reviewed journal, the Disability Studies Quarterly. The journal is published exclusively online. SDS has created a good model to follow when approaching publishers about their accessibility.

In 2015, Adam Newman organized the "Digital Access Facilitation Team" (DAFT) to make the 2015 annual conference of the Society for Disability Studies more accessible for a wider range of attendees. DAFT is coordinated by the Society's Student Caucus, whose members are a group of 25–30 students of SDS. Working in teams of two, members of DAFT were live-tweeting every session, contingent upon the consent of presenters. Live-tweeting all sessions and following standards for that emerging media, allowed a new way of producing accessibility for the disability community. In the Society for Disability Studies, there are a number of caucuses which "designate groups that are under-represented within society or SDS as an organization." DAFT is composed entirely of students (undergraduate, graduate, professional) who work on behalf of the interest and needs of students.

Membership 
There are several options for membership opportunities, even if someone is unable to pay the membership fees they will not be turned away; "No one is denied membership in SDS due to an inability to pay an established membership fee."

Awards 
Two awards have been established by the society "to honor individuals who have shown dedication to Disability studies": the Senior Scholar Award and the Irving K. Zola Award for Emerging Scholars in Disability Studies. The Senior Scholar Award is awarded to individuals who have made significant contributions to the field of disability studies. Past award winners: Devva Kasnitz (2014), Richard Scotch (2013), Carol Gill (2012), Tobin Siebers (2011), Rosemarie Garland Thomson (2010), Elizabeth Depoy and Stephen Gilson (2009), and Steven J. Taylor (2008). On the contrary, the Irving K. Zola Award for Emerging Scholars in Disability Studies is awarded to an up-and-coming individual who also has made significant contributions to the field of disability studies.

Board of Directors 
2017–2018:
 President and Chairperson – Phil Smith
 Vice-chairperson – Joanne Woiak
 Treasurer – Carol Goldin
 Secretary – Katherine Caldwell

List of SDS Presidents 
Below is a list of the current and past presidents of the SDS.

_
2018–2020
Joanne Woiak
–
2020–2021
Holly Pearson and Suzanne Stolz
–
2021–Present
Karen Nakamura and Joe Stramondo

References

Further reading 
 Monaghan, P. "Pioneering Field of Disability Studies Challenges Established Approaches and Attitudes." Chronicle of Higher Education, (January 23, 1998).
 Ramirez, A. "Disability as Field of Study?" New York Times, 21 December 1997.

External links 
 
 Disability Studies Quarterly Journal website

Disability organizations
Disability studies
International learned societies
Social sciences organizations
International organizations based in the United States
501(c)(3) organizations